The Cardenal Quintero Municipality is one of the 23 municipalities (municipios) that makes up the Venezuelan state of Mérida and, according to a 2007 population estimate by the National Institute of Statistics of Venezuela, the municipality has a population of 9,546.  The town of Santo Domingo is the administrative centre of the Cardenal Quintero Municipality.

Demographics
The Cardenal Quintero Municipality, according to a 2007 population estimate by the National Institute of Statistics of Venezuela, has a population of 9,546 (up from 8,049 in 2000). This amounts to 1.1% of the state's population.

Government
The mayor of the Cardenal Quintero Municipality is Pedro Segundo Rivas Moreno, re-elected on October 31, 2004, with 89% of the vote.  The municipality is divided into two parishes; Capital Cardenal Quintero and Las Piedras.

See also
Santo Domingo
Mérida
Municipalities of Venezuela

References

Municipalities of Mérida (state)